The last complete piano concerto by Sergei Prokofiev, Piano Concerto No. 5 in G major, Op. 55, dates from 1932.

Background
Prokofiev's last piano concerto dates from 1932, a year after he finished the fourth piano concerto, whose solo part is for left hand only. According to the composer, he was then inspired to write another for two hands, whose intended simplicity was reflected in the desire to call it, not a concerto, but rather 'Music for Piano and Orchestra.' However, as the piece grew in complexity, Prokofiev decided to include it among his numbered concerti instead. It is in five short movements. The longest, a Larghetto, is around seven minutes in length. The remaining four movements are all in a fast tempo and feature virtuoso keyboard writing; the third movement, only around two minutes long, functions as a variation on the first.

Movements
The concerto lasts 20–25 minutes, with five movements:
Allegro con brio (4–5 min) (G major)
Moderato ben accentuato (3–4 min) (C major)
Toccata: Allegro con fuoco (1–2 min) (G major)
Larghetto (6–7 min) (B-flat major)
Vivo (5–6 min) (B-flat minor-G major)

Instrumentation
The work is scored for solo piano, 2 flutes, 2 oboes, 2 clarinets, 2 bassoons, 2 horns, 2 trumpets, 2 trombones, timpani, bass drum, snare drum and strings.

Analysis
The concerto exudes a particularly boisterous, even blustering atmosphere. The movements one to three feature similar themes, the first and third begin similarly, all three captivate largely by their rhythm. The second begins with lightning glissandi, introducing a dancing theme, later contrasted by more spreading motions. It ends in curiosity.
The fourth movement comes as a bit of a surprise after what seems to be a fairly closed work. It is the longest and accordingly the slowest of all and has a climax of heroic grandeur. The Vivo opens poignantly, then goes over into a quieter mood, making use of the unconventional Locrian mode. The concerto ends at a blazing volume.

Premiere
It was performed by Prokofiev himself at the piano on October 31, 1932, accompanied by the Berlin Philharmonic conducted by Wilhelm Furtwängler.

Recordings
Sviatoslav Richter's recording of this concerto with Witold Rowicki on Deutsche Grammophon is widely admired.

References

External links
 The Prokofiev Page
 
 

Piano concertos by Sergei Prokofiev
1932 compositions
Compositions in G major